Baby Brokers is a 1994 American true-life-event drama film directed by Mimi Leder and written by Susan Nanus. The film stars Cybill Shepherd, Nina Siemaszko, Anna Maria Horsford, Jeffrey Nordling, Tom O'Brien, Joseph Maher and Shirley Knight. The film premiered on NBC on February 21, 1994.

Plot
Debbie Freeman (Shepherd) is an LA psychotherapist who wants to adopt a baby. An expectant couple, Leanne (Siemaszko) and Frankie Dees (O'Brien), who at first appear willing to let her privately adopt their child in exchange for financially supporting them for six months during Leanne's pregnancy, disappear when Freeman discovers they are in negotiations with another couple. The Dees, who gave up numerous children in the past while scamming multiple couples with each pregnancy, also run out on the latest prospective parents, leaving behind an incriminating notebook with names and phone numbers. Taking her story public, Freeman is instrumental in the Dees' arrest and Leanne's later conviction in federal court for multiple counts of mail and wire fraud. Freeman's going public with her anguish in losing a child she expected to adopt results in a woman reaching out to her to arrange a private adoption.

Cast 
Cybill Shepherd as Debbie Freeman
Nina Siemaszko as Leeanne Dees
Anna Maria Horsford as Randi
Jeffrey Nordling as John
Tom O'Brien as Frankie Dees
Joseph Maher as Leo
Shirley Knight as Sylvia
Gary Werntz as Dick Plager
Leah Lail as Carly
Lou Liberatore as Tom Culbert
Scott Jaeck as Scott Tillman
Lynn Milgrim as Laurie Tillman
Peter Crook as Dr. Robert Silk
Catherine MacNeal as Rita Hoyt
Bob McCracken as Alan Hoyt
Barbara Worthington as Sister Elizabeth
Takayo Fischer as Dr. Emily Weiss
Esther Scott as Polly O'Neill
Patricia Childress as Angela
Secunda Wood as Julia 
Paul Perri as Dr. Carlson
Terry Murphy as Herself
Lynn Milgrim as Laurie Tillman

References

External links
 

1990s American films
1994 television films
1990s English-language films
1994 drama films
1994 films
NBC network original films
Films directed by Mimi Leder
American drama television films